Michael Rowbotham is a political and economic writer and commentator based in the UK who is primarily known for his two books, The Grip of Death: A Study of Modern Money, Debt Slavery, and Destructive Economics (1998) and Goodbye America (2000).

The Grip of Death 
The Grip of Death: A Study of Modern Money, Debt Slavery, and Destructive Economics focuses on what he believes to be inequities in the practice of fractional-reserve banking (which he equates with counterfeiting) and the economic distortions he believes to be inherent in the so-called debt-based monetary system which almost all nations use in the modern age. In Goodbye America, Rowbotham argues that Third World debt is immoral, invalid, and inherently unrepayable.

See also
 Criticism of fractional-reserve banking
 List of monetary reformers
 Monetary reform
 Soft currency

References

English economists
Monetary economics
Monetary reformers
Year of birth missing (living people)
Living people